Fulcinini is an Australian praying mantis tribe in the subfamily Fulciniinae.

Genera
The Mantodea Species File lists:
 Calofulcinia Giglio-Tos, 1915
 Fulcinia Stal, 1877
 Fulciniella Giglio-Tos, 1915
 Hedigerella Werner, 1933
 Ima (mantis) Tindale, 1924
 Machairima Beier, 1965
 Nannofulcinia Beier, 1965
 Papugalepsus Werner, 1928
 Pilomantis Giglio-Tos, 1915
 Tylomantis Westwood, 1889

References

External links
 

Nanomantidae
Mantodea tribes